Thomas Eldred (1561–1624) was an English merchant and mariner. He is notable for having sailed with Thomas Cavendish on the ship Desire, during the second English circumnavigation of the globe between 1586 and 1588.

He lived at 97 Fore Street, Ipswich, and was commemorated by a pub with his name, until it was removed in 2012. 

He was buried in the churchyard of St Clement's Church.

References

1561 births
1624 deaths
English sailors
English merchants
16th-century English businesspeople
17th-century English businesspeople